Usman Adil (born 3 October 1994) is an Afghan cricketer. In September 2018, he was named in Kabul's squad in the first edition of the Afghanistan Premier League tournament. He made his Twenty20 debut for Kabul Zwanan in the 2018–19 Afghanistan Premier League on 18 October 2018.

References

External links
 

1994 births
Living people
Afghan cricketers
Kabul Zwanan cricketers
Place of birth missing (living people)